The 400 Blows is a 1959 French coming-of-age drama film, and the directorial debut of François Truffaut. The film, shot in DyaliScope, stars Jean-Pierre Léaud, Albert Rémy, and Claire Maurier. One of the defining films of the French New Wave, it displays many of the characteristic traits of the movement. Written by Truffaut and Marcel Moussy, the film is about Antoine Doinel, a misunderstood adolescent in Paris who struggles with his parents and teachers due to his rebellious behavior. Filmed on location in Paris and Honfleur, it is the first in a series of five films in which Léaud plays the semi-autobiographical character.

The 400 Blows received numerous awards and nominations, including the Cannes Film Festival Award for Best Director, the OCIC Award, and a Palme d'Or nomination in 1959, and was also nominated for an Academy Award for Best Original Screenplay in 1960. The film had 4.1 million admissions in France, making it Truffaut's most successful film in his home country.

The 400 Blows is widely considered one of the best French films in the history of cinema; in the 2012 Sight & Sound critics' poll of the greatest films ever made, it was ranked 39th. It ranked 13th in the directors' poll on the same list.

Plot
Antoine Doinel is a young boy growing up in Paris. Misunderstood by his parents for playing truant from school and stealing and tormented in school for discipline problems by his teacher (such as writing on the classroom wall, and later falsely explaining his absence as having been due to his mother's death), Antoine frequently runs away from both places. He finally quits school after his teacher accuses him of plagiarizing Balzac. (Antoine loves Balzac and in a school essay he describes "the death of my grandfather", in a close paraphrase of Balzac from memory.) He steals a Royal typewriter from his stepfather's workplace to finance his plans to leave home, but, having been unable to sell it, is apprehended while trying to return it.

The stepfather turns Antoine over to the police and Antoine spends the night in jail, sharing a cell with prostitutes and thieves. During an interview with the judge, Antoine's mother confesses that her husband is not Antoine's biological father. Antoine is placed in an observation center for troubled youths near the seashore (as his mother wished). A psychologist at the center probes reasons for Antoine's unhappiness, which the youth reveals in a fragmented series of monologues.

While playing football with the other boys one day, Antoine escapes under a fence and runs away to the ocean, which he has always wanted to see. He reaches the shoreline of the sea and runs into it. The film concludes with a freeze-frame of Antoine, which, via an optical effect, zooms in on his face as he looks into the camera.

Cast

 Jean-Pierre Léaud as Antoine Doinel
 Albert Rémy as Julien Doinel, Antoine's stepfather
 Claire Maurier as Gilberte Doinel, Antoine's mother
 Guy Decomble as Sourpuss, School teacher
 Patrick Auffay as René Bigey, Antoine's best friend
 Georges Flamant as Monsieur Bigey, René's father
 Pierre Repp as an English teacher
 Daniel Couturier as Betrand Mauricet
 Luc Andrieux as Le professeur de gym
 Robert Beauvais as director of the school
  as Mme Bigey
  as L'inspecteur Cabanel
  as the examining magistrate
 Jacques Monod as commissioner
 Henri Virlojeux as the night watchman
 Jeanne Moreau as a woman looking for her dog
 Jean-Claude Brialy as a man trying to pick up a woman

Truffaut also included a number of friends (fellow directors) in bit or background parts, including himself and Philippe De Broca in the funfair scene; Jacques Demy as a policeman; Jean-Luc Godard and Jean-Paul Belmondo as overheard voices (Belmondo's in the print works scene).

Production

Title
The English title is a literal translation of the French that fails to capture its meaning, as the French title refers to the idiom "faire les quatre cents coups", meaning "to raise hell". On the first prints in the United States, subtitler and dubber Noelle Gillmor translated the title as Wild Oats, but the distributor Zenith did not like that and reverted it to The 400 Blows.

Themes
The semi-autobiographical film reflects events of Truffaut's life. In style, it references other French works—most notably a scene borrowed wholesale from Jean Vigo's Zéro de conduite. Truffaut dedicated the film to the man who became his spiritual father, André Bazin, who died just as the film was about to be shot.

Besides being a character study, the film is an exposé of the injustices of the treatment of juvenile offenders in France at the time.

According to Annette Insdorf writing for the Criterion Collection, the film is "rooted in Truffaut’s childhood." This includes how both Antoine and Truffaut "found a substitute home in the movie theater" and both did not know their biological fathers.

Filming locations
Most of The 400 Blows was filmed in Paris:
 Avenue Frochot, Paris 9th
 Eiffel Tower, Champ de Mars, Paris 7th
 Montmartre, Paris 18th
 Palais de Chaillot, Trocadéro, Paris 16th
 Pigalle, Paris 9th
 Rue Fontaine
 Sacré Cœur, Paris 18th
The exception was for scenes filmed at the reform school, which were filmed in Honfleur, a small coastal town in the northern French province of Normandy.

Reception
The film opened the 1959 Cannes Film Festival and was widely acclaimed, winning numerous awards, including the Best Director Award at Cannes, the Critics Award of the 1959 New York Film Critics' Circle and the Best European Film Award at 1960's Bodil Awards. It was nominated for Best Original Screenplay at the 32nd Academy Awards. The film holds a 99% "Certified Fresh" rating on Rotten Tomatoes, based on 65 reviews, with a weighted average of 9.3/10. The website's critical consensus states, "A seminal French New Wave film that offers an honest, sympathetic, and wholly heartbreaking observation of adolescence without trite nostalgia."

The film is among the top 10 of the British Film Institute's list of 50 films that should be seen by age 15.

Awards and nominations

Legacy
Truffaut made four other films with Léaud depicting Antoine at later stages of his life: Antoine and Colette (which was Truffaut's contribution to the 1962 anthology Love at Twenty), Stolen Kisses, Bed and Board, and Love on the Run.

Filmmakers Akira Kurosawa, Luis Buñuel, Satyajit Ray, Steven Spielberg, Jean Cocteau, Carl Theodor Dreyer, Richard Linklater, Tsai Ming Liang, Woody Allen, Richard Lester, P C Sreeram, Norman Jewison, Wes Anderson and Nicolas Cage have cited The 400 Blows as one of their favorite movies. Kurosawa called it "one of the most beautiful films that I have ever seen".

Martin Scorsese included it on a list of "39 Essential Foreign Films for a Young Filmmaker."

The film was ranked #29 in Empire magazine's list of "The 100 Best Films of World Cinema" in 2010. In 2018, the film was voted the eighth greatest foreign-language film of all time in BBC's poll of 209 critics in 43 countries.

The festival poster for the 71st Venice International Film Festival paid tribute to the film as it featured the character of Antoine Doinel portrayed by Jean-Pierre Léaud.

References

Further reading

External links

 
 
 
 
 The 400 Blows on NewWaveFilm.com
 The 400 Blows: Close to Home an essay by Annette Insdorf at the Criterion Collection
 ''The 400 Blows: Review by Roger Ebert

1950s coming-of-age drama films
1959 directorial debut films
1959 drama films
1959 films
Antoine Doinel
Cultural depictions of Honoré de Balzac
Films about juvenile delinquency
Films about runaways
Films directed by François Truffaut
Films set in Paris
Films set in schools
Films shot in Paris
Films with screenplays by François Truffaut
French black-and-white films
French coming-of-age drama films
1950s French-language films
1950s French films